The 2018 South East Asian Table Tennis Championships were held in Bali, Indonesia from 15 to 18 November 2018.

Medal summary

Medal table

Events

See also
Asian Table Tennis Union
Asian Table Tennis Championships

References

South East Asian Table Tennis Championships
South East Asian Table Tennis Championships
South East Asian Table Tennis Championships
Table Tennis Championships
Table tennis competitions in Indonesia
Asian Table Tennis Championships